Superbop is an album by trumpeter Red Rodney which was recorded in 1974 and released on the Muse label.

Reception 

The AllMusic review by Scott Yanow stated: "this 1974 effort ... is one of his most exciting recordings of the decade. The reason is that he is matched with the fiery trumpeter Sam Noto. ... There are plenty of fireworks on this trumpet-dominated set".

Track listing
 "Superbop" (Red Rodney, Sam Noto) - 6:09
 "The Look of Love" (Burt Bacharach, Hal David) - 4:39
 "The Last Train Out" (Noto) - 7:34
 "Fire" (Rodney, Noto) - 2:57
 "Green Dolphin Street" (Bronisław Kaper, Ned Washington) - 10:28
 "Hilton" (Jim Mulidore) - 7:02

Personnel
Red Rodney - trumpet
Sam Noto - trumpet, flugelhorn
 Mayo Tiano - trombone
 Jimmy Mulidore - alto saxophone, soprano saxophone, alto flute
Dolo Coker – piano
Ray Brown – bass
Shelly Manne – drums

References

Muse Records albums
Red Rodney albums
1974 albums
Albums produced by Don Schlitten